Zbigniew Stefan Messner (13 March 1929 – 10 January 2014) was a Communist economist and politician in Poland. His ancestors were of German Polish descent who had assimilated into Polish society. In 1972, he became Professor of Karol Adamiecki University of Economics in Katowice. He was a member of the Central Committee of the Polish United Workers' Party from 1981 to 1988, Deputy Prime Minister from 1983 to 1985, and 53rd Prime Minister from 1985 to 1988.

In 1988, Messner's cabinet received a motion of no confidence in the Sejm (Parliament) and had to transfer power to Mieczysław Rakowski. This was an unprecedented event in the Communist world, one of the strongest signs of democratic change brought by Mikhail Gorbachev. Alternatively, this change in cabinet could easily be viewed as one of many similar steps of internal reorganization conducted periodically by regimes in all Communist-dominated countries.

He died in Warsaw on 10 January 2014.

References

1929 births
2014 deaths
People from Stryi
People from Stanisławów Voivodeship
Members of the Politburo of the Polish United Workers' Party
Prime Ministers of the Polish People's Republic
Deputy Prime Ministers of Poland
Members of the Polish Sejm 1985–1989
Polish economists
Recipients of the Order of Polonia Restituta